Achaea Football Clubs Association is one of the oldest Greek amateur football clubs associations, representing teams from the Greek regional unit of Achaea.

History
It was founded in 1927 in Patras. Members included teams from the prefectures of Aetolia-Acarnania, Elis, Kefalonia and Zakynthos.  Aetolia-Acarnania established its own association in 1969, Elis and Zakynthos in 1971, and in 1975 Kefalonia (as Kefalonia and Ithaca Football Clubs Association).
Founding members of the association were the teams:
Panachaiki
Olympiakos Patras
Apollon Patras
Thyella Patras
Lefkos Asteras Patras
Iraklis Pyrgos
Aris Aitoliko

Organization
The association is a member of the Hellenic Football Federation and organizes a regional football league and cup. It currently represents 700 football players and 156 amateur men's football clubs (126 of which are active).

Six of these football clubs are playing in national leagues. The only women's football club of Achaia F.C.A. is playing in the first national league.

The football clubs are separated in four leagues:
Achaia F.C.A. A League (16 clubs)
Achaia F.C.A. A1 League (18 clubs)
Achaia F.C.A. B League (41 clubs in three divisions)
Achaia F.C.A. C league (24 clubs in three divisions)

International participation
Achaia F.C.A. eliminated the collective teams of other amateur Greek leagues in 2005, thus representing Greece in the UEFA Regions' Cup in Budapest (UEFA's top amateur competition where only one team composed of players from one amateur domestic league can qualify).

List of champions
as first Greece level championship

1924 Panachaiki
1925 Panachaiki
1926 Olympiakos Patras
1927 Olympiakos Patras
1929 Panachaiki
1930 Panachaiki
1931 Panachaiki
1934 Panachaiki
1935 ΑΕΚ Patras
1936 Panachaiki
1940 Olympiakos Patras
1944 Achilleas Patras
1945 Apollon Patras
1946 Apollon Patras
1947 Apollon Patras
1948 Apollon Patras
1949 Panachaiki
1950 Olympiakos Patras
1951 Thyella Patras
1952 Thyella Patras
1953 Thyella Patras
1954 Panachaiki
1955 Panachaiki
1956 Panachaiki
1957 Panachaiki
1958 Panachaiki
1959 Panachaiki

as second Greece level championship

1960 Olympiakos Patras
1961 Panachaiki
1962 Panachaiki

as third Greece level championship

1963 Thyella Patras
1964 Patraikos
1965 Olympiakos Patras
1966 Patraikos
1967 Iraklis Patras
1968 A.C. Patras
1969 Panegialios
1970 Patreas
1971 Achaiki
1972 Elpida Eglikada Patras
1973 Thyella Patras
1974 Α.C. Patras
1975 Aris Patras
1976 Panegialios
1977 Panegialios

as fourth Greece level championship

1978 Achaiki
1979 Agios Dimitrios
1980 AEK Patras
1981 Ethnikos Patras
1982 ΑΕΚ Patras

as fifth Greece level championship

1983 Aris Patras
1984 Thyella Patras
1985 Aris Patras
1986 Thyella Patras
1987 Ethnikos Patras
1988 Dafni Patras
1989 Panegialios
1990 Astrapi Psarofai
1991 Ethnikos Sageika
1992 Zavlani
1993 Atromitos
1994 Pigasos Patras
1995 Aris Patras
1996 Ethnikos Patras
1997 Achilleas Patras
1998 Ethnikos Sageika
1999 Panathinaikos Patras
2000 Ethnikos Patras
2001 Thyella Patras
2002 Diakopto
2003 Fostiras Ovria
2004 Astrapi Psarofai
2005 Zavlani
2006 Atromitos Lappas
2007 Achilleas Kamares
2008 Diagoras Vrachneika
2009 Ethnikos Sageika
2010: Tritaios
2011: Thyella

Cup Achaea

1972 Aris Patras
1973 Thyella Patras
1974 Ethnikos Patras
1975 Ethnikos Sageika
1976 Ethnikos Sageika
1977 Achaiki
1978 Aris Patras
1979 Achaiki
1980 Achaiki
1981 Ethikos Aegion
1982 Α.C. Patras
1983 Α.C. Patras
1984 Α.C. Patras
1985 Ethnikos Patras
1986 Α.C. Patras
1987 Zavlani
1988 Α.C. Patras
1989 Achaiki
1990 Α.C. Patras
1991 Aris Patras
1992 Astrapi Psarofai
1993 Aris Patras
1994 Panegialios
1995 Α.C. Patras
1996 Ethnikos Patras
1997 Achaiki
1998 Doxa Chalandritsa
1999 Ethnikos Patras
2000 Patraikos
2001 Cyprous Patras
2002 Aris Patras
2003 Aris Patras
2004 Zavlani
2005 Fostiras Ovria
2006 Zavlani
2007 Panegialios
2008 Achilleas Kamaron
2009 Panegialios
2010: Atromitos Lappa
2011: Tritaiikos
2012:Diagoras Vraxneika

Super Cup Achaea

2003 Aris Patras - Fostiras Ovria 3-0
2006 Atromitos Lappas - Zavlani 2-0
2007 Panegialios - Anagenissi/Aias Sympoliteia 8-2
2008 Achilleas Kamares - Diagoras Vrachneika 1-0
2009: Ethnikos Sageika - Panaigialeios 0-0 (4-2 pen)
2010: Tritaiikos - Atromitos Lappa 4-2
2011: Tritaiikos - Thyella 1-0

References

The first version of this article has been based in the text of :el:Ε.Π.Σ. Αχαΐας of the Greek Wikipedia published under GFDL.
 rssf
 

Association football governing bodies in Greece